Melandri is an Italian surname. Notable people with the surname include:

Marco Melandri (born 1982), Italian MotoGP road racer
Francesca Melandri (born 1964), Italian novelist and filmmaker
Giovanna Melandri (born 1962), Italian politician

Italian-language surnames
it:Melandri